Johnny Grainger was a Scottish association football inside forward who played professionally in the American Soccer League and Eastern Professional Soccer League.

In December 1922, Grainger signed with Bethlehem Steel. Grainger remained with Bethlehem Steel through the 1927–28 season. In August 1928, Grainger and Bethlehem Steel could not agree on a contract and the team placed him on the transfer list. The Fall River Marksmen picked him up and he played the 1928–1929 season in Massachusetts. In August 1929, Grainger moved to the IRT Rangers of the Eastern Professional Soccer League. He played four games, then moved to the New Bedford Whalers by November 1929.

International
Grainger was called into the US for a 6 November 1926 game against Canada, but did not enter the game.

External links

References

American Soccer League (1921–1933) players
Bethlehem Steel F.C. (1907–1930) players
Eastern Professional Soccer League (1928–29) players
Fall River Marksmen players
IRT Rangers players
New Bedford Whalers players
Association football forwards
Scottish footballers
Scottish expatriate footballers
Expatriate soccer players in the United States
Scottish expatriate sportspeople in the United States
Year of birth missing